This is a list of Australian television-related events in 1974.

Events
18 March – The Reg Grundy Organisation's new Australian daily soap opera for teenagers set in a secondary school Class of 74 starts screening on Seven Network and is shown five nights a week. The following year it was changed to Class of 75, before getting axed.
1 April – Long running American soap opera The Young and the Restless starts its very first broadcast in Australia on Nine Network.
9 June – Australian horror anthology series The Evil Touch airs its final episode on Nine Network.
21 June – A new short lived Australian science fiction television series for children called Alpha Scorpio debuts on ABC only running for six episodes.
October – Test colour transmissions commence across all networks.
8 November – Australian music program Countdown premieres on ABC with Grant Goldman as the very first host.
31 December – News Limited and Nine Network have launched a 28-hour telethon to raise funding for the relief effort of Darwin, Northern Territory after the city was wiped out by Cyclone Tracy.

Debuts

New International Programming
21 January –  The Electric Company (ABC)
15 February/4 April –  Hawkins (15 February: Seven Network - Sydney, 4 April: Seven Network - Melbourne)
1 April –  The Young and the Restless (Nine Network)
1 April –  Dusty's Trail (Nine Network)
15 April –  Help!... It's the Hair Bear Bunch! (Nine Network)
21 April –  Kojak (The 0-10 Network)
6 May –  The Beachcombers (ABC)
13 May –  Mission: Magic! (The 0-10 Network)
26 May –  Whatever Happened to the Likely Lads? (ABC)
27 May –  Wild, Wild World of Animals (ABC)
10 June –  Bailey's Comets (Nine Network)
26 June –  Shaft (Seven Network)
30 June –  The Six Million Dollar Man (The 0-10 Network)
1 July –  Thriller (Seven Network)
20 July –  Butch Cassidy and the Sundance Kids (ABC)
28 July –  My Favorite Martians (ABC)
3 August –  Jack the Ripper (1973) (ABC)
18 August –  Man About the House (ABC)
14 September –  Needles and Pins (ABC)
22 September –  Happy Days (Nine Network)
17 October –  The Ascent of Man (ABC)
19 October –  Speed Buggy (ABC)
3 November –  Adam's Rib (Seven Network)
6 November/9 December –  Doc Elliot (6 November: Nine Network - Sydney, 9 December: Nine Network - Melbourne)
12 December –  Bob & Carol & Ted & Alice (Nine Network)
 Inch High, Private Eye (Nine Network)
 Super Friends (1973) (The 0-10 Network)

Television shows

1950s
Mr. Squiggle and Friends (1959–1999).

1960s
Football Inquest (1960–1974)
Four Corners (1961–present).
It's Academic (1968–1978)
Division 4 (1969–1975)
GTK (1969–1974)

1970s
Hey Hey It's Saturday (1971–1999, 2009–2010).
Young Talent Time (1971–1988)
Countdown (1974–1987).

Ending this year

See also
 1974 in Australia
 List of Australian films of 1974

References